Meyer's Castle or the Joseph Ernest Meyer House is a former private residence in the town of Dyer, Indiana in the United States. The castle was constructed from 1927 to 1931 in the Jacobethan style by architect Cosbey Bernard, Sr. The house was built for Joseph Ernest Meyer as his private residence, a herbologist and one of Hammond's first millionaires. The building now serves as a special events venue and is also home to "Rivelli", an Italian steakhouse.

The castle was built as a replica of a Scottish castle Meyer had once seen. When it was completed in 1931, the Meyer's Castle was the largest and most lavish mansion in the surrounding Calumet region. Its location in the forested area allowed Meyer to continue his practice of herbology. The hill on which the estate sits atop of is called "Indian Hill" due to the many Sauk and Potowami artifacts found in and around the vicinity.  It is also one of the highest points in Lake County, IN.

Joseph Meyer lived in Meyer's Castle until his death in 1950, leaving the castle to his wife Cecilia, who lived there for several years after his death. After the death of Cecilia Meyer in 1975, the entire castle grounds and complex was sold to the East Dyer Development Company, which subsequently became today's Castlewood Subdivision of Dyer.
The castle was purchased from the town of Dyer by Cynthia and Charles Curry and later sold.

The property was purchased in 1987.  At the time of purchase, the property was in an abandoned and dilapidated state.  It was renovated and returned to its original majestic state.  They now operate the property as a special events venue and along with a reservation only restaurant.  Visitors are welcomed by peacocks that roam the grounds.

See also
 List of Registered Historic Places in Indiana

References

External links
 Meyer's Castle official website

Houses on the National Register of Historic Places in Indiana
National Register of Historic Places in Lake County, Indiana
Jacobethan architecture
Houses completed in 1931
Houses in Lake County, Indiana
1929 establishments in Indiana